Marc Aguado Pallarés (born 22 February 2000) is a Spanish footballer who plays as a midfielder for FC Andorra, on loan from Real Zaragoza.

Club career
Born in Zaragoza, Aragon, Aguado represented Real Zaragoza as a youth, and made his senior debut with the reserves on 26 August 2018 by starting in a 1–0 Tercera División away loss against SD Tarazona. He scored his first senior goal on 23 September, netting the opener in a 2–1 away win over AD San Juan.

On 11 August 2020, after being a regular starter for the B-side, Aguado was loaned to Segunda División B side FC Andorra, for one year. The following 31 May, his contract with Zaragoza was extended until 2023, and his loan was renewed for a further season on 25 June 2021.

Aguado was a regular starter for the Andorrans during the campaign, appearing in 34 matches overall as the club achieved a first-ever promotion to Segunda División. On 1 July 2022, his loan was extended to cover the 2022–23 season, with his contract being renewed until 2025.

Aguado made his professional debut on 15 August 2022, starting in a 1–0 away win over Real Oviedo.

References

External links

2000 births
Living people
Footballers from Zaragoza
Spanish footballers
Association football defenders
Segunda División players
Primera Federación players
Segunda División B players
Tercera División players
Real Zaragoza B players
Real Zaragoza players
FC Andorra players
Spanish expatriate footballers
Expatriate footballers in Andorra
Spanish expatriate sportspeople in Andorra